The 225th Street station is a local station on the IRT White Plains Road Line of the New York City Subway. Located in Williamsbridge, Bronx, at the intersection of 225th Street and White Plains Road, it is served by the 2 train at all times and by the 5 train during rush hours in the peak direction.

History
This station was built under the Dual Contracts. On March 3, 1917, the IRT White Plains Road Line was extended from East 177th Street–East Tremont Avenue to East 219th Street–White Plains Road, providing the Bronx communities of Williamsbridge and Wakefield with access to rapid transit service. Service was initially operated as a four-car shuttle from 177th Street due to the power conditions at the time. The city government took over the IRT's operations on June 12, 1940.

It was renovated in fall 2005 at a cost of $13.23 million.

Station layout

This elevated station has three tracks and two side platforms. The center track is normally not used in revenue service. Both platforms have beige windscreens and red canopies with green outlines, frames, and support columns in the center and black, waist-high steel fences at either ends with lampposts at regular intervals. The windscreens have mesh fences at various points. The station signs are in the standard white lettering on black name plates.

The 2006 artwork here is called Universal City by Nicky Enright. It consists of stained glass windows on the platform windscreens depicting images related to astronomy, including constellations, shooting stars, orbiting planets, and moons.

Exits
This station has one elevated station house beneath the center of the platforms and tracks. Two staircases from each platform go down to a waiting area. The back of the token booth faces the crossunder with steel fences on either side. On the Wakefield-bound side, there are two exit only turnstiles. On the Manhattan-bound side, there is an emergency gate and a bank of three turnstiles. Outside fare control, two staircases go down to the northwest and southeast corners of 225th Street and White Plains Road. The station house has glass windows.

References

External links 

 
 nycsubway.org — Universal City Artwork by Nicky Enright (2006)
 Station Reporter — 2 Train
 The Subway Nut — 225th Street Pictures 
 MTA's Arts For Transit — 225th Street (IRT White Plains Road Line)
 225th Street entrance from Google Maps Street View
Platforms from Google Maps Street View

IRT White Plains Road Line stations
New York City Subway stations in the Bronx
Railway stations in the United States opened in 1917
1917 establishments in New York City
Williamsbridge, Bronx